The 1989 Damallsvenskan was the second season of the Damallsvenskan. Matches were played between 21 April and 29 September 1989. Jitex BK won the league by one point from Malmö FF. Defending champions Öxabäck IF came in third. In the playoffs, Jitex won the finals. 

The two teams promoted before the season were Djurgården and Mariestads BoIS. At the end of the season, Trollhättans IF and IK Brage were relegated.

Table

Playoffs

Semifinals
The first matches were played on 7 October, and the first teams marked played at home first. The return games took place on 14 October (Malmö – Öxabäck) and 15 October (Jitex – Djurgården).

Jitex won on away goals.

Final
The final was played on 29 October and 5 November 1989. The first home team are marked first.

External links
 bolletinen.se

Damallsvenskan seasons
1989 in association football
1989 in Swedish sport